Villa is a village in Võru Parish, Võru County in southeastern Estonia. It has a population of 16 and an area of 1.2 km².

References

Võru Parish
Villages in Võru County